The Police Forensic Science Laboratory Dundee (PFSLD) was established in April 1989. There are four main departments: Biology, Chemistry, the national DNA Database and Quality/Administration.

PFSLD is funded by and serves Central Scotland Police, Fife Constabulary and Tayside Police and along with the 3 other police laboratories in Scotland, is independent from the Forensic Science Service of England and Wales. The PFSLD houses the DNA database for the whole of Scotland, and exports copies to the UK National DNA Database.

Further reading

See also
 DNA
 Forensic science
 Law enforcement in Scotland

External links
 Official website

1989 establishments in Scotland
Law enforcement agencies of Scotland
Organisations based in Dundee
Science and technology in Dundee
Databases in Scotland
Government databases in the United Kingdom
Government agencies established in 1989
Forensics organizations
Science and technology in Scotland